This is a list of inductees in the National Sprint Car Hall of Fame.

1990
Christopher J.C. Agajanian
Arthur Chevrolet
Louis Chevrolet
Larry Dickson
August Duesenberg
Fred Duesenberg
A. J. Foyt
Tommy Hinnershitz
Frank Lockhart
Rex Mays
Harry Arminius Miller
Barney Oldfield
Jan Opperman
Gus Schrader
Wilbur Shaw 
Floyd "Pop" Dreyer
Jack Gunn
Ralph Hankinson
J. Alex Sloan
Floyd Trevis

1991
Ralph DePalma
Louis Meyer
Duke Nalon
Ted Horn
Parnelli Jones
Don Edmunds
Duane "Pancho" Carter
Ernie Triplett
Emory Collins
Hector Honore
Jerry Richert, Sr.
Art Sparks
Bud Winfield
Ed Winfield
Frank Funk
Fred Wagner
Al Sweeney
Marion Robinson

1992
Bobby Grim
Tommy Milton
Sheldon Kinser
Jud Larson
Eddie Rickenbacker
Bob Sall
Rich Vogler
Tony Willman
Art Pillsbury
John Vance
Alex Morales
Earl Gilmore
Ennis "Dizz" Wilson
Dick Gaines
T. E. "Pop" Myers
Sam Nunis
John Gerber
Ronnie Allyn

1993
Gary Bettenhausen
Duane Carter, Sr.
Joie Chitwood
Chris Economaki
Ira Hall
Jim Hurtubise
Roger McCluskey
Troy Ruttman
Myron Stevens
Ira Vail
A. J. Watson
Lloyd Axel
Walt James
Bob Trostle
Frank Winkley

1994
Don Branson
Jimmy Bryan
Sig Haugdahl
Frank Kurtis
George "Doc" MacKenzie
Fred Offenhauser
Elbert "Babe" Stapp
Jimmy Wilburn
Ralph Capitani
Earl Baltes
Deb Snyder
Leo Goossen
Karl Kinser
O. D. Lavely
Marshall "Shorty" Pritzbur

1995
Bob Sweikert
Pete DePaolo
Pat O'Connor
Johnny Rutherford
Bill Ambler
John Ambler
Pete Folse
Bill Hill
Rick Ferkel
Gaylord White
Frank Luptow
Richard "Mitch" Smith
Wally Meskowski
Don Smith
LaVern Nance
Louis Vermeil

1996
Emil Andres
Mario Andretti
Tom Bigelow
Mike Nazaruk
Johnny Thomson
Jerry Blundy
Lynn Paxton
Roy Richwine
Bill Pickens
Russ Clendenen
Rollie Beale
Willie Davis
Ted Halibrand
John Sloan
J. W. Hunt
Paul Weirick

1997
Joe James
Stubby Stubblefield
Bobby Unser
Travis "Spider" Webb
Bruce Bromme, Sr.
Tom Cherry
Charlie Curryer
Vern Fritch
Hiram Hillegass
Leo Krasek
Dick Tobias
Dick Wallen
Kenny Weld
Harry Wimmer
Gordon Woolley

1998
Sam Hanks
Harry Hartz
Norman "Bubby" Jones
Bill Schindler
Greg Weld
Bobby Allen
Gary Patterson
Dean Thompson
Grant King
Bob Weikert
Tom Holden
Ted Johnson
Gene Van Winkle

1999
Eddie Sachs
Johnny White
Al Gordon
Ray Lee Goodwin
Lealand McSpadden
Bob Kinser
Clarence "Hooker" Hood
LeRoy Van Conett
Russ Garnant
Steve Stapp
Granvel Henry
Don Basile
John Sawyer
Fred Loring
Larry Sullivan

2000
Joe Saldana
Al "Cotton" Farmer
Chester "Chet" Gardner
Earl Halaquist
Allen Heath
Bert Emick
Beryl Ward
Harold Leep
Jimmy Oskie
Steve Smith
Tom Marchese
Bob Russo
Paul Fromm
August "Gus" Hoffman
D. William "Speedy Bill" Smith
Chester "Chet" Wilson
L. A. "Les" Ward

2001
Emmett "Buzz" Barton
Brad Doty
Bob Hogle
Eddie Leavitt
Albert "Buddy" Taylor
Davey Brown, Sr.
Bob Estes
Gary Stanton
Don Martin
Jack Miller
Dick Sutcliffe
Don Mack

2002
Jack Hewitt
Jim McElreath
Everett Saylor
Dick Berggren - announcer, editor of Stock Car Racing magazine
Larry "Smokey" Snellbaker
J. Gordon Betz
Sam Traylor
Joe Scalzo
Lloyd Beckman
Ralph "Speedy" Helm
Maynard "Hungry" Clark
John Bagley
Galen Fox

2003
Sammy Sessions
Billy Winn
Clarence "Mutt" Anderson
Armin Krueger
John "Jack" Shillington Prince
Jay Woodside
Robert Roof
Bud Carson
Al Hamilton
Fred Horey
Ron Shuman  Elected on first ballot eligible on age
Bill Utz
Doug Wolfgang Elected on first ballot eligible on age

2004
Bryan Saulpaugh
Chuck Amati
Sherman "Red" Campbell
Chuck Gurney 
Keith Kauffman 
Bob Slater
Billy Wilkerson
Jim Culbert
Ralph Morgan
"Boston" Louie Seymour
Walter E. Bull
Bruce Craig
R. Keith Hall
Don Peabody

2005
Steve Butler
Bob Carey
Elmer George
Bill Holland
Steve Kinser Elected on first ballot eligible on age
Robbie Stanley
Don Brown
Ray Tilley
Dick Simonek
John Mahoney
Jim Raper
Norm Witte
Kenny Woodruff

2006
Lee Kunzman
Sammy Swindell
Lanny Edwards
Johnny Hannon
Rickey Hood
Bob Pankratz
Jud Phillips
Francis Quinn
Newton "Buzz" Rose
Jimmy Sills
Granville "Buster" Warke
Taylor "Pappy" Weld
Ted Wilson

2007
Joe Jagersberger
Bayliss Levrett
Shane Carson
Jerry "Scratch" Daniels
Rajo Jack
Kenny Jacobs
Hal Minyard
Earl Gaerte
Glen Niebel
Ken Coles
Emmett Hahn
Bill White

2008
Tony Bettenhausen
Louis "Rusty" Espinoza
Glenn Fitzcharles
Bob Hampshire
Doug Howells
Dick Jordan
Brent Kaeding
John Padjen
Johnnie Parsons
Gordon Schroeder
Earl Wagner
Kramer Williamson

2009
Allan Brown      
Jim Chini      
Jack Elam      
Lee Elkins      
Jac Haudenschild    
Jackie Holmes      
Tommy Nicholson     
Lee Osborne   
Cavino "Kelly" Petillo   
Roger Rager      
Fred Rahmer      
Louis Senter    
Rodney "Rip" Williams

2010
Clyde Adams    
Bobbie Adamson      
Hank Arnold     
George Bentel
Fred Brownfield      
Ben Krasner      
Fred Linder      
Casey Luna      
Frank Riddle      
Hal Robson      
Herman Schurch      
Don Shepherd

2011
W.W. Bowen
Jimmy Boyd
Bruce Bromme, Jr.
Bob Burman
Wally Campbell
Andy Granatelli
Leonard Kerbs
Danny Lasoski
Gene Marderness
Della Rice
Emmett Shelley
Joe Sostilio
Gary Wright

2012
Johnny Anderson
Thad Dosher
Sam Hoffman
Harry Hosterman
Chuck Hulse
C. Henry Meyer
A. Earl Padgett
Colby Scroggin
Ron Shaver
Gary Sokola
Bill Vandewater
Bobby Ward

2013
Charles "Dutch" Baumann
Art Bisch
Lou Blaney
Jeff Bloom
Richard Hoffman
Harols "Red" Lempelius
Andy Linden
Jean Lynch
Ernest Moross
Brad Noffsinger
Edd Sheppard
C.W. Van Ranst

2014
Dave Argabright
Larry Beckett
Dave Blaney
Bobby Davis
Mark Kinser
William "Windy" McDonald
Chuck Merrill
George Nesler

2015
Mike Arthur
Roger Beck
"Tiger" Gene Brown
Brice Ellis
Don Kreitz
Danny Smith
Gil Sonner
Charlie Wiggins

2016
Dale Blaney  
Doug Clark (Official at Knoxville Raceway)  
Gene Crucean  
Roy "Bud" Grimm Jr.  
Shirley Kear Valentine  
Frankie Kerr  
Mark Light  
Gus Linder

2017
Doug Auld  
Earl Cooper 
Dave Darland
Tony Elliott  
Guy Forbrook  
Terry McCarl  
John Singer  
Pat Sullivan

2018
Steve Beitler  
Bryan Clauson (elected on first ballot eligible after death)  
Lance Dewease  
Oscar "Red" Garnant  
Scott Gerkin  
Emmett J. Malloy  
Bob Mays  
Dave Steele (elected on first ballot eligible after death)

2019
Jason Johnson (elected on first ballot eligible after death)
Stevie Smith
Richard Griffin
M. A. Brown
C. K. Spurlock
Tom Schmeh
Greg Stephens
Bill Endicott

2020/21
Bill Cummings
Walt Dyer
Greg Hodnett
Don Lamberti
Paul Leffler
L. Spencer Riggs
Tim Shaffer
Jeff Swindell

2022
Bob Frey
John Gibson
Eric Gordon
Terry Gray
Tim Green
Ralph Heintzelman Sr.
John Kromer
Robin Miller
Walter T. Ross
Dennis Roth
Walter "Slim" Rutherford
Tony Stewart
Reference for 2022 inductees:

References

External links
Official website
List of inductees

Sports hall of fame inductees